Tirto Samudro beach or Bandengan Beach is located  north of downtown Jepara, Central Java, Indonesia.

It has a concentration of Hotel and Resort and quite popular for Beach tourism in Central Java.

References

Tourism in Jepara
Beaches of Central Java
Landforms of Central Java
Landforms of Java